The Minerva Building was a skyscraper once planned for the eastern edge of London's main financial district, the City of London.

History

A revised planning application by developers Minerva plc for the 53-storey version was submitted during the week ending 12 July 2002. The original proposal for the site, known as the St. Botolph's House, was a 14-storey office block.

Its location marks the Eastern gateway to the City and the building might have acted as a focus for the regeneration of the eastern City fringe. The site is outside the strategic views of St. Paul's, and does not contain listed buildings, although it does infringe upon a conservation area. It also lies within one of the three proposed viewing cones for the Tower of London, as do 30 St Mary Axe, Heron Tower and Tower 42.

The developers claimed that a restaurant would have been open to the public on the highest floor.

In March 2006, amidst the Cash for Peerages political scandal, it emerged that the Office of the Deputy Prime Minister had not called in the application for the Minerva Building (nor Minerva's Park Place proposals in Croydon) shortly after two of Minerva's senior figures had made major donations and loans to the Labour Party. This led some commentators to make a connection between the loans and the decision.

In mid-2006 it was announced that Minerva, deep within a period of financial consolidation, were no longer actively pursuing development of the site. A mid-rise commercial development has occurred instead on the site.

References

External links
Minerva Building on SkyscraperNews
Minerva official site

Skyscrapers in the City of London